Vomeronasal type-1 receptor 4 is a protein that in humans is encoded by the VN1R4 gene.

References

Further reading

G protein-coupled receptors